European emigration is the successive emigration waves from the European continent to other continents. The origins of the various European diasporas can be traced to the people who left the European nation states or stateless ethnic communities on the European continent.

From 1500 to the mid-20th century, 60-65 million people left Europe, of which less than 9% went to tropical areas (the Caribbean, Asia, and Africa).

From 1815 to 1932, 65 million people left Europe (with many returning home), primarily to "areas of European settlement" in North and South America, in addition to South Africa, Australia, New Zealand, and Siberia.
These populations also multiplied rapidly in their new habitat; much more so than the populations of Africa and Asia. As a result, on the eve of World War I, 38% of the world's total population was of European ancestry.
Most European emigrants to the New World came from Germany, Ireland, United Kingdom, Italy, Spain, Portugal, France, the Netherlands, Norway, Sweden, Poland, Russia, and Ukraine.

More contemporary, European emigration can also refer to emigration from one European country to another, especially in the context of the internal mobility in the European Union (intra-EU mobility) or mobility within the Eurasian Union.

History

8th - early 5th century BC: Greek settlement

In Archaic Greece, trading and colonizing activities of the Greek tribes from the Balkans and Asia Minor propagated Greek culture, religion and language around the Mediterranean and Black Sea basins. Greek city-states were established in Southern Europe, northern Libya and the Black Sea coast, and the Greeks founded over 400 colonies in these areas. 
Alexander the Great's conquest of the Achaemenid Empire marked the beginning of the Hellenistic period, which was characterized by a new wave of Greek colonization in Asia and Africa; the Greek ruling classes established their presence in Egypt, southwest Asia, and Northwest India.
Many Greeks migrated to the new Hellenistic cities founded in Alexander's wake, as geographically dispersed as Uzbekistan and Kuwait.

1450-1800: Emigration to the Americas
The European continent has been a central part of a complex migration system, which included swaths of North Africa, the Middle East and Asia Minor well before the modern era. Yet, only the population growth of the late Middle Ages allowed for larger population movements, inside and outside of the continent. The European exploration of the Americas stimulated a steady stream of voluntary migration from Europe.

Spain and Portugal 
About 200,000 Spaniards settled in their American colonies prior to 1600, a small settlement compared to the 3 to 4 million Amerindians who lived in Spanish territory in the Americas.

During the 1500s, Spain and Portugal sent a steady flow of government and church officials, members of the lesser nobility, people from the working classes and their families averaging roughly three-thousand people per year from a population of around eight million. A total of around 437,000 left Spain in the 150-year period from 1500 to 1650 mainly to Mexico, Peru in South America, and the Caribbean Islands. It has been estimated that over 1.86 million Spaniards emigrated to Latin America in the period between 1492 and 1824, one million in the 18th century, with millions more continuing to immigrate following independence.

Between 1500 and 1700, 100,000 Portuguese crossed the Atlantic to settle in Brazil. However, with the discovery of numerous highly productive gold mines in the Minas Gerais region, the Portuguese emigration to Brazil increased by fivefold. From 1500, when the Portuguese reached Brazil, until its independence in 1822, from 500,000 to 700,000 Portuguese settled in Brazil, 600,000 of whom arrived in the 18th century alone. From 1700 until 1760, over half a million Portuguese immigrants entered Brazil. In the 18th century, thanks to the gold rush, the capital of the province of Minas Gerais, the town of Vila Rica (today, Ouro Preto) became for a time one of the most populous cities in the New World. This massive influx of Portuguese immigration and influence created a city which remains to this day, one of the best examples of 18th century European architecture in the Americas.
However, the development of the mining economy in the 18th century raised wages and employment opportunities in the Portuguese colony and emigration increased: in the 18th century alone, about 600,000 Portuguese settled in Brazil.

General European emigration 
Roughly one and a half million Europeans settled in the New World between 1500 and 1800 (see table). The table excludes European immigrants to the Spanish Empire from 1650 to 1800 and Portuguese immigration to Brazil from 1760 to 1800. While the absolute number of European emigrants during the Early Modern period was very small compared to later waves of migration in the nineteenth and twentieth centuries, the relative size of these early modern migrations was nevertheless substantial.

Between one-half and two-thirds of European immigrants to the Thirteen Colonies between the 1630s and the American Revolution came under indentures. The practice was sufficiently common that the Habeas Corpus Act 1679, in part, prevented imprisonments overseas; it also made provisions for those with existing transportation contracts and those "praying to be transported" in lieu of remaining in prison upon conviction. In any case, while half the European immigrants to the Thirteen Colonies had been indentured servants, at any one time they were outnumbered by workers who had never been indentured, or whose indenture had expired. Free wage labor was more common for Europeans in the colonies.

Indentured persons were numerically important, mostly in the region from Virginia north to New Jersey. Other colonies saw far fewer of them. The total number of European immigrants to all 13 colonies before 1775 was about 500,000-550,000; of these, 55,000 were involuntary prisoners. Of the 450,000 or so European arrivals who came voluntarily, Tomlins estimates that 48% were indentured. About 75% were under the age of 25. The age of legal adulthood for men was 24 years; those over 24 generally came on contracts lasting about 3 years. Regarding the children who came, Gary Nash reports that, "many of the servants were actually nephews, nieces, cousins and children of friends of emigrating Englishmen, who paid their passage in return for their labour once in America."

Figures for immigration in the Spanish Empire in 1650-1800 and in Brazil in 1700-1800 are not given in the Table.

In North America, immigration was dominated by British, Spanish, French and other Northern Europeans. Emigration to New France laid the origins of modern Canada, with important early immigration of colonists from Northern France.

Emigration in the 19th and 20th centuries
Mass European emigration to the Americas, South Africa, Australia and New Zealand took place in the 19th and 20th centuries. This was the effect of a dramatic demographic transition in 19th-century-Europe, subsequent wars and political changes on the continent. From the end of the Napoleonic Wars in 1815 to the end of World War I in 1918, millions of Europeans emigrated. Of these, 71% went to North America, 21% to Central and South America and 7% to Australia. About 11 million of these people went to Latin America, of whom 38% were Italians, 28% were Spaniards and 11% were Portuguese.

In Brazil, the proportion of immigrants in the national population was much smaller. Immigrants tended to be concentrated in the central and southern parts of the country. The proportion of foreigners in Brazil peaked in 1920, at just 7 percent or 2 million people, mostly Italians, Portuguese, Germans and Spaniards. However, the influx of 4 million European immigrants between 1870 and 1920 significantly altered the racial composition of the country. From 1901 to 1920, immigration was responsible for only 7 percent of Brazilian population growth, but in the years of high immigration, from 1891 to 1900, the share was as high as 30 percent (higher than Argentina's 26 percent in the 1880s).

The countries in the Americas that received a major wave of European immigrants from 1820s to the early 1930s were: the United States (32.5 million), Argentina (6.5 million), Canada (5 million), Brazil (4.5 million), Venezuela (2.2 million), Cuba (1.3 million), Chile (728,000), Uruguay (713,000). Other countries that received a more modest immigration flow (accounting for less than 10 percent of total European emigration to Latin America) were: Mexico (226,000), Colombia (126,000), Puerto Rico (62,000), Peru (30,000), and Paraguay (21,000).

Arrivals in the 19th and the 20th centuries

Legacy

Distribution

After the Age of Discovery, different ethnic European communities began to emigrate out of Europe with particular concentrations in Australia, New Zealand, the United States, Canada, Argentina, Uruguay, Colombia, Venezuela, Cuba, Costa Rica, Brazil, Chile, and Puerto Rico where they came to constitute a European-descended majority population. It is important to note, however, that these statistics rely on identification with a European ethnic group in censuses, and as such are subjective (especially in the case of mixed origins). Nations and regions outside Europe with significant populations:

Canada
In the first Canadian census in 1871, 98.5% chose a European origin with it slightly decreasing to 96.3% declared in 1971. In the 2016 census, 19,683,320 self-identified with a European ethnic origin, the largest being of British Isles origins (11,211,850). Individually, they are English (6,320,085), French (4,680,820), Scottish (4,799,005), Irish (4,627,000), German (3,322,405), Italian (1,587,965).

United States
At the time of the first U.S. census in 1790, 80.7% of the American people self-identified as White, where it remained above that level, even reaching as high as 90% prior to the passage of the Immigration and Nationality Act of 1965. However, numerically it increased from 3.17 million (1790) to 199.6 million exactly two hundred years later (1990).

Mexico

The European Mexican population is estimated by the government in 2010 as 47% of the population (56 million) using phenotypical traits (skin color) as the criteria. The use of skin color palettes as the primary criteria to estimate the ethnoracial groups that inhabit a given country has its origin in the investigations produced by Princeton and Vanderbilt Universities, which found it to be more accurate than self-identification particularly in Latin America, where the different discourses that exist in regards to national identity have rendered previous attempts to estimate ethnic groups unreliable. If the criterion used is the presence of blond hair, it is 18% - 23%.

Caribbean and Central America

Cubans of European origin (primarily Spanish) reached its highest proportion during the early to mid twentieth century. In 1943 the census showed 74.3% (3,553,312 people) self identified as (blanco) white.

In Costa Rica 83.7% of the population is White and Mestizo. Other sources estimate different results between whites and mestizos. Most are of Spanish and Italian descent, however there are also German, Polish and French communities. During the last half of the 19th century and the first half of the 20th century, it welcomed more than 100,000 Europeans, mainly from Spain and Italy. It is estimated that about 50,000 Spaniards and Italians, 10,000 Germans and 40,000 Europeans of other nationalities, especially from France Poland and England. Costa Rica had the greatest European migratory impact in Central America. When Costa Rica became independent, the population was barely 60,000 inhabitants.

In El Salvador 12.7% of the population identifies as "white", 86.3% of the population were mestizo or people of mixed European and Amerindian ancestry. The majority being Spanish descendants from Galicia and Asturias. In El Salvador, settlement peaked between 1880 and 1920, when 120,000 European and Arab immigrants entered the country, the Europeans being mostly Italians, Spanish and Germans.

In Guatemala, 5% of the population is of European descent, primarily of either Spanish and German origins. Many German, Italian and Spanish Families arrived in Guatemala, the Germans for their part were the largest group, Immigration had a massive character

South America
In Argentina, 85% of the population or 38,416,407 are estimated to be of European descent.

The Falkland Islanders are mainly of European descent, especially British, and can trace their heritage back 9 generations or 200 years. In 2016, the census showed that 42.9 percent were native born and 27.4 percent were born in the U.K. (the second largest birthplace) for a total of more than 70 percent. The Falkland Islands were entirely unoccupied and were first claimed by Britain in 1765. Settlers largely from Britain, especially Scotland and Wales arrived after the 1830s. The total population of then islands grew from a 287 estimate in 1851 to 3,200 in the most recent 2016 census. 
The Origins of Falkland Islanders historically had a Gaucho presence.

In Peru the official 2017 census, 5.9% or (1.3 mil) 1,336,931 people 12 years of age and above self-identified their ancestors as White or of European descent. This was the first time a question on race or ancestors had been asked since the 1940 census. There were 619,402 (5.5%) males and 747,528 (6.3%) females. The region with the highest proportion of Peruvians with self-identified European or white origins was in the La Libertad Region (10.5%), Tumbes Region and Lambayeque Region (9.0%). Most are descendants of early Spanish settlers with substantial numbers of Italians and Germans.

Australia and New Zealand

Using data from the 2016 census, it was estimated that around 58% of the Australian population were Anglo-Celtic Australians with 18% being of other European origins, a total of 76% for European ancestries as a whole. As of 2016, the majority of Australians of European descent are of English 36.1%, Irish 11.0%, Scottish 9.3%, Italian 4.6%, German 4.5%, Greek 1.8% and Dutch 1.6%. A large proportion —33.5%— chose to identify as ‘Australian’, however the census Bureau has stated that most of these are of old Anglo-Celtic colonial stock.

Europeans historically (especially Anglo-Celtic) and presently are still the largest ethnic group in New Zealand. Their proportion of the total New Zealand population has been decreasing gradually since the 1916 census where they formed 95.1 percent. The 2018 official census had over 3 million people or 71.76% of the population were ethnic Europeans, with 64.1% choosing the New Zealand European option alone.

African coast (Macaronesia)

Canary Islanders are the descendants of Spaniards who settled the Canary Islands. The Canarian people include long-tenured and new waves of Spanish immigrants, including Andalucians, Galicians, Castilians, Catalans, Basques and Asturians of Spain; and Portuguese, Italians, Dutch or Flemings, and French. As of 2019, 72.1% or 1,553,078 were native Canary islanders with a further 8.2% born in mainland Spain. Many of European origins including those of Isleño (islander) lineage have also moved to the islands, such as those from Venezuela and Cuba. Presently there are 49,170 from Italy, 25,619 from Germany, United Kingdom (25,521) and others from Romania, France and Portugal.

Asia
In Asia, European-derived populations (specifically Russians), predominate in North Asia and some parts of Northern Kazakhstan.

Approximately 5-7 million Muslim migrants from the Balkans (from Bulgaria 1.15 million-1.5 million; Greece 1.2 million; Romania, 400,000; Former Yugoslavia, 800,000), Russia (500,000), the Caucasus (900,000 of whom 2/3 remained the rest going to Syrian, Jordan and Cyprus) and Syria (500,000 mostly as a result of the Syrian Civil War) arrived in Ottoman Anatolia and modern Turkey from 1783 to 2016 of whom 4 million came by 1924, 1.3 million came post-1934 to 1945 and more than 1.2 million before the outbreak of the Syrian Civil War. Today, between a third and a quarter of Turkey's population of almost 80 million have ancestry from these Muhacirs.

Populations of European descent

See also

References

Bibliography
 
 
 

European diaspora
European people
Europe
Western culture